The Galway Intermediate Football Championship is an annual Gaelic football competition contested by mid-tier Galway GAA clubs.
The winners of the Galway Championship qualify to represent their county in the Connacht Intermediate Club Football Championship.
The winners also receive promotion to compete in the following year's senior grade.

Qualification for subsequent competitions

Connacht Intermediate Club Football Championship
The Galway IFC winners qualify for the Connacht Intermediate Club Football Championship. It is the only team from County Galway to qualify for this competition. The Galway IFC winners enter the Connacht Intermediate Club Football Championship at the quarter-final stage.

All-Ireland Intermediate Club Football Championship
The Galway IFC winners — by winning the Connacht Intermediate Club Football Championship — may qualify for the All-Ireland Intermediate Club Football Championship, at which they would enter at the semi-final stage.

Roll of honour

References

External links
Official Galway Website
Galway on Hoganstand
Galway Club GAA

Gaelic football competitions in County Galway
Galway GAA club championships
Intermediate Gaelic football county championships